The American Society for Gastrointestinal Endoscopy (ASGE) is a professional organization of physicians dedicated to improving endoscopy. The ASGE is made up largely of gastroenterologists from the United States. Included in its membership are endoscopists from other medical specialties as well as from other countries. ASGE publishes the medical journal Gastrointestinal Endoscopy.

"The core purpose of the American Society for Gastrointestinal Endoscopy is to be the leader in advancing and promoting excellence in gastrointestinal endoscopy."

History
American Society for Gastrointestinal Endoscopy was founded on December 30, 1941. Established as the American Gastroscopic Society, the organization changed its name in 1961 to the "American Society for Gastrointestinal Endoscopy." As of 2017, the budget for ASGE was about $17.8 million.

Services
American Society for Gastrointestinal Endoscopy sponsors grants for research in gastroenterology and endoscopy.

Goals
ASGE will be recognized by its members for helping them to improve their endoscopic practice. 
Regulatory and credentialing agencies will look to ASGE as the source of expertise in the practice of endoscopy. 
ASGE benefits the profession and the public by promoting valuable, ongoing research in endoscopy and its application to disease management and prevention. 
Members will have access to up-to-date, quality education. 
Improve the quality of endoscopy delivered to the public.

References

Further reading

External links
 ASGE main website

Medical associations based in the United States
Gastroenterology organizations
Medical and health organizations based in Illinois